Adaptec was a computer storage company and remains a brand for computer storage products. The company was an independent firm from 1981 to 2010, at which point it was acquired by PMC-Sierra, which itself was later acquired by Microsemi, which itself was later acquired by Microchip Technology.

History

Larry Boucher, Wayne Higashi, and Bernard Nieman founded Adaptec in 1981. At first, Adaptec focused on devices with Parallel SCSI interfaces. Popular host bus adapters included the 154x/15xx ISA family, the 2940 PCI family, and the 29160/-320 family. Their cross-platform ASPI was an early API for accessing and integrating non-disk devices like tape drives, scanners and optical disks. With advancements in technology, RAID functions were added while interfaces evolved to PCIe and SAS.

On May 10, 2010, PMC-Sierra, Inc. and Adaptec, Inc. announced they had entered into a definitive agreement of PMC-Sierra acquiring Adaptec's channel storage business on May 8, 2010, which included Adaptec's RAID storage product line, the Adaptec brand, a global value added reseller customer base, board logistics capabilities, and SSD cache performance solutions. The transaction was expected to close in approximately 30 days, subject to customary closing conditions. Following the sale, Adaptec would retain its Aristos ASIC technology business, certain real estate assets, more than 200 patents, and approximately $400 million in cash and marketable securities.

On June 8, 2010, PMC-Sierra and Adaptec announced the completion of the acquisition. PMC-Sierra renamed the channel storage business "Adaptec by PMC". PMC-Sierra was in turn acquired by Microsemi in January 2016.

The old Adaptec, Inc. changed its name to ADPT Corporation, and then again to Steel Excel, Inc. Steel Excel is now an investment firm.

Products
Adaptec produced interface products involving SCSI, USB, IEEE 1394, iSCSI, Fibre Channel, and video. Adaptec once produced CD- and DVD-burning software under the brand names of Easy CD Creator and Toast, as well as network-attached storage devices such as the Snap Server product line.

The Adaptec brand is used to sell host bus adapters, RAID adapters, SAS expander cards, cables, and accessories.

Sources
 The New York Times: November 2, 1999 - "Adaptec Looks To Strengthen Data-Storage Line"

References

External links

 Funding Universe History of Adaptec

Technology companies established in 1981
Computer storage companies
Companies based in Sunnyvale, California
Electronics companies of the United States
1981 establishments in California